The 2021 Jacksonville State Gamecocks football team represented Jacksonville State University in the 2021 NCAA Division I FCS football season. The Gamecocks competed in the AQ7, a football partnership between the Western Athletic Conference (WAC) and the ASUN Conference, until the ASUN began play as a football conference. Jacksonville State was led by eighth-year head coach John Grass for the first nine games of the season before Grass resigned. Maxwell Thurmond was appointed interim head coach for the final two games of the year. Jacksonville State finished the season with an overall record of 5–6 and a mark of 3–3 in conference play, tying for fourth place in the AQ7. The team played home games at Burgess–Snow Field at JSU Stadium in Jacksonville, Alabama.

Previous season
The Gamecocks finished the 2020–21 season 10–3, 6–1 in OVC play to win the Ohio Valley Conference championship. The Gamecocks defeated Davidson in the first round of the FCS playoffs before losing to Delaware in the quarterfinals.

The 2020–21 season was JSU's last in the OVC. On January 29, 2021, the ASUN announced that JSU was one of three schools that would join the conference on July 1 of that year. This marked JSU's return to the conference where it was previously a member from 1995 to 2003.

Schedule

References

Jacksonville State
Jacksonville State Gamecocks football seasons
Jacksonville State Gamecocks football